Vochepshiy is a rural locality (an aul) in the district of Teuchezhsky in the Republic of Adygea, Russia.

Vochepshiy is an Adyghe village and the residents are from different Adyghe families, specially the Pshedatok, Kosho, and Nakai families.

References

Rural localities in Teuchezhsky District